Discovery Turbo (previously known as Discovery Turbo MAX in Australia) is a pay television channel devoted to programming about transport. It is similar to Discovery Velocity and Motor Trend. It was also briefly available as an on-demand service in the US in the late 2000s.

Feeds

Discovery Turbo Latin America 

The channel launched in Latin America in 2005.

Discovery Turbo UK 

It launched on 1 March 2007, replacing Discovery Wings and Discovery Kids.

Discovery Turbo Asia 
Discovery Turbo launched in Southeast Asia on September 22, 2008, replacing Discovery Real Time. Discovery Turbo Asia ended its broadcast on July 7, 2014 as it has been rebranded to DMAX on the same day.

Discovery Turbo India 

The channel launched on January 28, 2010. From March 1, 2021 the channel started to follow a timeshifted version of DMAX Asia's schedule.

Discovery Turbo Australia 
In Australia, the channel first launched in 2008 on SelecTV, replacing Discovery Real Time which previously launched on 15 March 2007. The channel ceased being available in late 2010 following SelecTV's closure of its English service. A , named Discovery Turbo MAX, launch on 15 November 2009 on the Foxtel platform. At launch, the channel was also available on a two-hour delay, with the time shift channel called Discovery Turbo MAX +2. In May 2015, the channel rebranded as Discovery Turbo, seeing it change to a similar branding to that used by other Discovery Turbo channels around the world.

Discovery Turbo New Zealand 
In New Zealand, the channel is known as Discovery Turbo, with similar branding and content to other Discovery Turbo channels around the world. It launched on 1 November 2015 on channel 75 exclusively to Sky Television.

DTX in Europe 

In Europe, the channel is known as DTX (formerly known Discovery Turbo Xtra), with similar branding and content to other Discovery Turbo channels around the world. It launched on 17 September 2013 in Poland, replaced Discovery World, and later roll-out in Turkey and Eastern Europe. However, later in Poland, in second half of November 2016, DTX replaced Discovery Turbo Xtra.

Discovery Turbo Japan 
The channel launched on 30 January 2018.

Programming

UK and Ireland 

 A Bike is Born
 A Racing Car is Born
 American Chopper
 Auto Trader
 
 Bangla Bangers
 Beetle Crisis
 British Biker Build-Off
 Campervan Crisis
 Car That Rocks with Brian Johnson
 Chasing Classic Cars
 Chop Shop: London Garage
 Desert Car Kings
 Fast N' Loud
 Fifth Gear
 The Garage
 The Great Biker Build-Off
 Inside West Coast Customs
 Martin Shaw: Aviators
 Monster Garage
 Overhaulin'
 Street Customs
 Thunder Races
 Warlock's Rising
 World's Toughest Drive
 Wreck Rescue

Asia (2008–2014), Australia and New Zealand (2008-2019) 

Check out the Australian & NZ Discovery Website

 Airplane Repo
 American Chopper
 A Bike Is Born
 American Trucker
 All Girls Garage
 American Hot Rod
 Bad Chad Customs
 Barrett-Jackson
 Biker Build-Off
 Car Crash TV
 Car Chasers
 Chasing Classic Cars
 Car Crash Global
 Chrome Underground
 Car Fix
 Dallas Car Sharks
 Diesel Brothers
 Dirty Mudder Truckers
 Extreme Machines
 Extreme Car Hoarders
 Fast N’ Loud
 Fifth Gear
 Fastest Cars In The Dirty South
 Garage Squad
 Garage Rehab
 Gear Dogs
 Goblin Works Garage
 The Great Biker Build-Off
 Hand Built Hot Rods
 Hell Roads
 How It’s Made: Dream Cars
 Iron Resurrection
 Inside West Coast Customs
 Junkyard Empire
 JDM Legends
 Jay Leno’s Garage
 Kindig Customs (Bitchin’ Rides)
 Last Car Standing The Last Outpost Misfit Garage Monster Garage Mighty Car Mods Mighty Ships Mega Shippers Overhaulin' Pit Crews Railroad Alaska Restoration Garage Ridiculous Rides Sacred Steel Bikes Street Outlaws Summernats Street Outlaws: No Prep Kings Street Outlaws: Memphis Salvage Hunters: Classic Cars Street Outlaws: New Orleans Speed Is The New Black Supertruckers ToyMakerz Twin Turbos Texas Metal Trick My Truck Turbo Pickers Unique Rides Unique Whips Wrecks To Riches Wheeler Dealers Wheeler Dealers: Trading Up World’s Most Expensive Rides Wrench’d Wheels That Fail Latin America 

 A Bike is Born American Chopper American Hot Rod Auto Trader Beetle Crisis Campervan Crisis Chasing Classic Cars Concorde: The Final Flight Destroyed in Seconds The Detonators Engineering Le Mans Extreme Machines Firepower Flight Deck Flying Heavy Metal Futureweapons Garage Dreams The Garage The Great Biker Build-Off 
 The Greatest Ever Hard Shine Heartland Thunder Hyperspeed Kit Car Crisis Los CARvotta Marine Machines Mark Williams On The Rails Martin Shaw: Aviators Monster Garage Overhaulin' Racer Girls Robocars Sunrides Earth Trainspotting Trains With Pete Waterman Ultimate Biker Challenge 
 Ultimate Car Build-Off Vroom Vroom Warbots Weaponology Weaponizers Weeeee Cars Weird Wheels What's My Car Worth? Wheeler Dealers World's Biggest Airliner: Building The Airbus A380 Wrecks to Riches''

References

Television channels and stations established in 2007
Warner Bros. Discovery networks
Television channels and networks about cars